Jorgensen Engineering is a global processing equipment-supplier with headquarters in Odense, Denmark.

History 

Jorgensen Engineering A/S was established in 1933, under the name of Bøg Jørgensens Maskinfabrik by engineer Rasmus Bøg Jørgensen. 
After having worked in the United States for 10 years, Mr. Jørgensen had gained experience in the field of constructions, and in 1935 the first canning machines were made. From then on, processing equipment was the core business, and today, Jorgensen Engineering mainly supplies systems for handling food, pet food, and pharmaceutical packaging. 
Rasmus Bøg Jørgensen was in front of the company until 1955, when his son, engineer Paul Bøg Rasmussen took over. Under his management, export was heavily expanded, and in 1974 the company of Jorgensen Food Engineering ApS was established. In 1987, the company was made public and took the name of Jorgensen Engineering A/S. In 2016, Jorgensen Engineering becomes a member of the Swedish Xano Group.

Products 
 Conveying systems for packaging (cans, glass jars, cartons, bottles, bags, and plastic packaging)
 Loading/unloading stations for retorts
 Palletizing/depalletizing
 Sterilization & cleaning systems 
 Filling lines for milk powder
 Automation/control systems
 Robotics
 Equipment for quality assurance and food safety

External links 
Jorgensen Engineering
Article: Food Production Daily 
Article: Food Quality News
Article: CEE Pagckaging

Engineering companies of Denmark
Holding companies of Denmark
Companies based in Odense Municipality
Holding companies established in 1933
Robotics companies
Danish companies established in 1933
Manufacturing companies established in 1933